Naserabad (also Romanized as Nāşerābād) is a village in Howmeh Rural District, in the Central District of Iranshahr County, Sistan and Baluchestan Province, Iran. At the 2006 census, its population was 60, in 12 families.

References 

Populated places in Iranshahr County